Saroli is a small village near the Kausani hill station in Uttarakhand, India.

Location
The village is connected by a light vehicle road with Almora-Kausani-Bageshwar Road at Kausani.  The road is about 12 km due to large number of curves, but it is only about 7–10 km by the forest walk. It is about a 5–7 km road trip and a 10–11 km walking trip from the Garur. (about 25 km from Kausani).

Climate
The climate is always cool with some snowfall in winter.  A heavy rainfall makes flora and fauna  abundant. The hill above the village acts as huge tank and stores rainwater for the villagers.  There is a river flowing nearby the village which provides water.

Crops
Rice and wheat are the main crops.  Apart from this, villagers also grow onions, potatoes, and different fruits such as plums, and peaches.  The river water is a source of irrigation for all crops and sometimes for drinking purposes.

It is also said that once only salt was brought from Almora by horse back and the villagers did not require anything from the outside world.  Today, they still grow all the spices and vegetables.

Temples
The old Kalika Mandir Temple is inside the village on a small hill. The villagers worship many gods and their ancestors too.

Villages in Bageshwar district